Luperosaurus macgregori,  known commonly as MacGregor's wolf gecko or McGregor's flapped-legged gecko, is a species of gecko, a lizard in the family Gekkonidae. The species is endemic to the Philippines.

Etymology
The specific name, macgregori, is in honor of Richard C. MacGregor of the Science Bureau in Manila, who collected the holotype.

Geographic range
L. macgregori is found in the Calayan Islands in the Philippines.

Reproduction
L. macgregori is oviparous.

References

Further reading
Brown, Rafe M.; Siler, Cameron D.; Das, Indraneil; Min, Yong (2012). "Testing the phylogenetic affinities of Southeast Asia's rarest geckos: Flap-legged geckos (Luperosaurus), Flying geckos (Ptychozoon) and their relationship to the pan-Asian genus Gekko ". Molecular Phylogenetics and Evolution 63: 915–921.
Stejneger L (1907). "A New Geckoid Lizard from the Philippine Islands". Proceedings of the United States National Museum 33: 545–546. (Luperosaurus macgregori, new species).

Luperosaurus
Reptiles of the Philippines
Endemic fauna of the Philippines
Reptiles described in 1907
Taxa named by Leonhard Stejneger